Sugar is an album by jazz saxophonist Stanley Turrentine, his first recorded for the CTI Records label following his long association with Blue Note, featuring performances by Turrentine with Freddie Hubbard, George Benson, Ron Carter, and Billy Kaye with Lonnie Liston Smith added on the title track and Butch Cornell and Richard "Pablo" Landrum on the other two tracks on the original release. The CD rerelease added a live version of the title track recorded at the Hollywood Palladium in 1971.

Reception
The album is one of Turrentine's best-received and was greeted with universal acclaim on release and on subsequent reissues. The Allmusic review by Thom Jurek awarded the album 4½ stars and states "If jazz fans are interested in Turrentine beyond the Blue Note period — and they should be — this is a heck of a place to listen for satisfaction". The All About Jazz review by David Rickert states "Seldom does a group of musicians click on all levels and rise into the stratosphere, but this is one such record, a relic from a time when jazz was going through growing pains but still spawning some interesting projects. Turrentine was one of the lucky few who made his crowning achievement during this time".

Track listing
All compositions by Stanley Turrentine except as indicated.

 "Sugar" - 10:03
 "Sunshine Alley" (Butch Cornell) - 10:48
 "Impressions" (John Coltrane) - 14:14
 "Gibraltar" (Freddie Hubbard) - 9:35 (recorded at original session - not released until CD issue)
 "Sugar" [Live] - 14:29  Bonus track on the 2001 and 2010 CD releases
Recorded at Van Gelder Studio, Englewood Cliffs, New Jersey, November 1970 except track 5 recorded live at the Southgate Palace in Los Angeles on July 19, 1971.

Personnel
Stanley Turrentine - tenor saxophone
Freddie Hubbard - trumpet
Lonnie Liston Smith - electric piano (tracks 1,4)
Butch Cornell - organ (tracks 2,3)
George Benson - guitar
Ron Carter - bass
Billy Kaye - drums (tracks 1–4)
Richard "Pablo" Landrum - congas (tracks 2,3,4)

Track 5 Personnel
Stanley Turrentine - tenor saxophone
Freddie Hubbard - trumpet
Hubert Laws - flute
Johnny "Hammond" Smith - organ, electric piano
George Benson - guitar
Ron Carter - bass
Billy Cobham - drums
Airto Moreira - percussion

References

1970 albums
Stanley Turrentine albums
CTI Records albums
Albums produced by Creed Taylor
Albums recorded at Van Gelder Studio